Tapinoma philippinense is a species of ant in the genus Tapinoma. Described by Donisthorpe in 1942, the species is endemic to the Philippines.

References

Tapinoma
Hymenoptera of Asia
Insects described in 1942